This is a list of PlayStation 2 games for PlayStation 4 available from the PlayStation Store. These are the original games software emulated in high-definition with the addition of PlayStation 4 features such as Trophies, Remote Play and Share Play. These games are also playable on PlayStation 5 through backwards compatibility.

There are currently  games on this list.

A  indicates that the game is also available in the Classics Catalog for PlayStation Plus Premium subscribers.

List

See also
List of PlayStation 2 Classics for PlayStation 3
List of HD remasters for PlayStation consoles
Lists of PS one Classics

Notes

References

PlayStation 2
 
 
2